"Mama's Little Girl" is a song by Paul McCartney & Wings that was taped in March 1972 during the Red Rose Speedway recording sessions.

Recording and performance

The final mix was made in 1987 at Air Studios in London by McCartney, co-producer Chris Thomas and engineer Bill Price.

McCartney performed "Mama's Little Girl" as part of a medley during the 1973 James Paul McCartney television special, though it was not broadcast.

Personnel

Paul McCartney - vocals, acoustic guitar, drums, electric guitar, tambourine
Linda McCartney - tambourine, backing vocals
Denny Laine - backing vocals, bass
Henry McCullough - electric guitar
Denny Seiwell - African percussion
Heather McCartney - backing vocals

Release
"Mama's Little Girl" was intended to be included on Cold Cuts, an album of outtakes which was never released.

"Mama's Little Girl" was officially issued: 
In 1990 as the B-side of the "Put It There" single & on the 2 CD Japanese version of the Flowers in the Dirt album. 
In 1993 as a bonus track on the 1993 remastered CD edition of Wings' 1971 Wild Life album.
In 2018 as part of the Red Rose Speedway Archive Collection.

Track listings 
This song was released as a 7" single, a 12" maxi-single, and a CD single.

7" single
 "Put It There"
 "Mama's Little Girl"

12" single
 "Put It There"
 "Mama's Little Girl"
 "Same Time Next Year"

CD single
 "Put It There"
 "Mama's Little Girl"
 "Same Time Next Year"

References

1972 songs
Paul McCartney songs
Songs written by Paul McCartney
Song recordings produced by Paul McCartney
Music published by MPL Music Publishing
Paul McCartney and Wings songs